Lebedyn is a city in Sumy Oblast, Ukraine.

Lebedyn may also refer to:

 Lebedyn (air base), a former air base in Ukraine
 Lebedyn, Cherkasy Oblast, a village in Shpola Raion, Cherkasy Oblast, Ukraine
 Lebedyn Raion, a raion in Sumy Oblast in Central Ukraine
 Lebedyn, a village in Boryspil Raion, Kyiv Oblast

See also 
 Lebedyn cattle, a Ukrainian cattle breed